Carl Alexander Herzog von Württemberg (Father Odo OSB) (12 March 1896 – 27 December 1964) was a member of the House of Württemberg who became a Benedictine monk. During the Nazi and post-Nazi era, he provided aid to refugees, Jews, and prisoners of war and was reported to Nazi authorities for these activities. He acted as an informant of the Federal Bureau of Investigation and spied on Wallis Simpson, the lover and later wife of the former British king Edward VIII.

Life 

Carl Alexander was the third son of Albrecht, Duke of Württemberg and his wife, Archduchess Margarete Sophie of Austria. He also had four younger sisters. He was taught at home and attended high school after 1914.

In World War I, he fought on the Western Front in Italy. He resigned from the army at the rank of captain, following the German Revolution of 1918–1919, and within a few months became a postulant at the Abbey of St. Martin in Beuron. He entered the novitiate in 1920 as "Brother Odo", taking vows in February 1921. His father succeeded King Wilhelm II, a distant cousin, as head of the House of Württemberg in October of that same year. Brother Odo was ordained a priest in 1926. In the summer of 1930, Father Odo was sent to the Abbey of St. Martin, in Weingarten, not far from Castle Altshausen. He held several offices in the monastery and was active with different Catholic youth organizations. Because of his position and his family's conservative Catholic values, he was involved in opposition to National Socialism as early as 1933 and was interrogated by the Gestapo several times.

He left the abbey and traveled to Württemberg in 1934. The Nazis expelled Father Odo from Germany in 1936, and he took refuge in monasteries in Switzerland and Italy. In Switzerland, he founded International Catholic Refugees and traveled through Europe.

Emigration to the United States 

In 1940, after the Swiss government informed him that they could not guarantee his safety, Father Odo decided to emigrate to the United States. Before leaving, he destroyed his personal papers, so his activities could not be traced in detail. From 1941 Father Odo lived in Washington, D. C., continuing his work with refugees and enabling Jews to emigrate from Germany and its conquered territories. From 1943 onward, he was involved in the pastoral care of Germans in  American prisoner of war camps. He told the Federal Bureau of Investigation that the Duchess of Windsor had been sleeping with Joachim von Ribbentrop when he was the German ambassador in London (1936–1938).

The historian and archivist of the House of Württemberg, Eberhard Fritz, believes that Claus von Stauffenberg's opposition to Adolf Hitler may have been partly motivated by his relationship with the House of Württemberg (Stauffenberg's father was the last Oberhofmarschall of the Kingdom of Württemberg). Stauffenberg was personally acquainted with Father Odo and was well aware of pockets of resistance against the Nazis.

After the end of World War II, Father Odo founded the Central European Rehabilitation Association (CERA), with the aim of providing war-torn Central Europe with food, clothing, medicine, and other necessities. In 1949, after CERA had fulfilled its function and was dissolved, Father Odo returned to the abbey of St. Bartholomew in Germany. He left the monastery in 1952 because of a heart condition, returning to his family castle in Altshausen. There he spent the last years of his life and was a refounder of the Yellow Hussars of Altshausen.

Father Odo was briefly interviewed and mentioned in the 1959 biography of his aunt Queen Mary of Teck by the British biographer James Pope-Hennessy. 

According to his wishes, Father Odo was buried in the cemetery of the Abbey of St. Martin at Weingarten, Württemberg.

Ancestry

Notes

External links 
Photographed with Philipp Albrecht, Duke of Württemberg and Prince Albrecht Eugen in 1951, one of the rare photographs available.

1896 births
1964 deaths
German Army personnel of World War I
 Military personnel of Württemberg
 German Benedictines
Carl Alexander
20th-century German Roman Catholic priests
Grand Crosses of the Order of Saint Stephen of Hungary